Archspire is a Canadian technical death metal band from Vancouver. They have released four studio albums and are currently signed to Season of Mist.

History 
The band was formed in 2007 as Defenestrated, but changed their name to Archspire in 2009. Members were singer Oli Peters (Oliver Aleron), guitarists Tobi Morelli and Dean Lamb, Bassist Jaron Evil (Jaron Good) and drummer Spencer Prewett. Singer Shawn Haché was with the band briefly but left to join Mitochondrion.

The band was signed to Trendkill Recordings and, in April 2011,  released their first album, All Shall Align. It was recorded between May and December 2010 working with producer Stuart McKillop at The Hive Studio in Calgary.

In early 2013, Jaron Evil suffered a stroke at age 31. He recovered and briefly returned to the band, but left permanently in late 2013. He was replaced by Clayton Harder.

Also in 2013, Archspire signed with Season of Mist, and recorded a second album with Stuart McKillop, at Vancouver's Rain City Recorders. On February 2, 2014, the band released a single from their upcoming album, "Lucid Collective Somnambulation", and in April released The Lucid Collective.

In January 2015 the band announced they were seeking a permanent bass player as a replacement for bassist Clayton Harder, who left to study jazz guitar at York University. They asked interested parties to record a video of themselves playing an Archspire song (they suggested "Deathless Ringing"). On January 12, 2016, the band announced that they had selected Jared Smith to become their full-time bassist, and posted Smith's playthrough video of "Lucid Collective Somnambulation".

The band announced their third album Relentless Mutation and a single, "Involuntary Doppelgänger", on July 5, 2017. The album was released on September 22, 2017. At the Juno Awards of 2018, the album received a nomination for Metal/Hard Music Album of the Year.

In 2019, the band made tech news headlines when a duo of programmers called Dadabots created a neural network trained on Archspire's music to produce a non-stop stream of technical death metal based on the band's music; Dadabots also noted that Archspire's music produced the most consistent AI results, presumably because of the high tempo and technical machine-like nature of the songs. Archspire themselves also commented on the phenomenon, jokingly referring to themselves as robots.

Later that year, Peters  and Prewett appeared in a cameo in the first episode of See; actor Jason Momoa is a fan of the band and asked Peters to coach him for a war cry technique.

On October 29, 2021, Archspire released their fourth studio album Bleed the Future. Three singles were released: "Golden Mouth of Ruin", "Bleed the Future", and "Drone Corpse Aviator". "Golden Mouth of Ruin" and "Drone Corpse Aviator" were accompanied by videos, with the latter being the first fully-produced video the band had made. The album was elected by Loudwire as the 16th best rock/metal album of 2021 and won the Juno Awards of 2022

Archspire has toured Canada, the US and Europe, played festivals such as Hellfest, and toured with Revocation, Obscura, Fallujah and Beneath the Massacre, among others.

Discography 
 All Shall Align (2011)
 The Lucid Collective (2014)
 Relentless Mutation (2017)
 Bleed the Future (2021)

Members

Current members 
Dean Lamb – 8-string guitar 
Tobi Morelli – 7 and 8-string guitar 
Spencer Prewett – drums 
Oli Peters (a.k.a. Oliver Rae Aleron) – vocals 
Jared Smith – bass

Former members 
Jaron Evil – bass, backing vocals 
Shawn Hache – vocals 
Clayton Harder – bass

Timeline

Awards and nominations

Juno Award

!
|-
!scope="row"| 2018
| Relentless Mutation
| Metal/Hard Music Album of the Year
| 
| style="text-align:center;"|
|-
!scope="row" |2022
| Bleed the Future
| Metal/Hard Music Album of the Year
| 
| style="text-align:center;" |
|}

Western Canadian Music Awards

!
|-
!scope="row" |2022
| Archspire
| Metal and Hard Music Artist of the Year
| 
| style="text-align:center;" |
|}

References

External links 
 

Season of Mist artists
Canadian death metal musical groups
Canadian technical death metal musical groups
Musical groups from Vancouver
Juno Award for Heavy Metal Album of the Year winners